'Royal Air Force Kingston Bagpuize or more simply RAF Kingston Bagpuize is a former Royal Air Force satellite airfield located near to Kingston Bagpuize, Oxfordshire, England.

History
RAF operations started in January 1942 as a Relief Landing Ground (RLG) with 3 EFTS who left in May. From March to July 1 GTS at RAF Thame used it as a satellite airfield for training with General Aircraft Hotspur gliders and their tugs. Between January and April 1943, 4 GTS operated from here. In March 1943 20 (P) AFU used the airfield as a satellite for the Airspeed Oxfords, but left in July.

The airfield was then closed while contractors enlarged it. The works were completed by January 1944 when the USAAF Ninth Air Force moved in. They used the airfield for maintenance work, mainly on Lockheed P-38 Lightning fighters and the photo-reconnaissance version, the F-5, and North American P-51 Mustang fighters. Their main use for the airfield appears to have been the testing of wire mesh as a runway surface, and some intensive testing was done from March to May, mainly with large numbers of Republic P-47 Thunderbolts and several Douglas C-47 transports.

The testing was completed by August 1944 when the airfield was handed over to 3 MU who used it for storage. The site was permanently closed on 14 June 1954. Most of the land reverted to agriculture, but some buildings remain in agricultural and industrial use, and some other buildings, including the control tower, remain in a derelict condition.

Units
The following units were here at some point:
 No. 3 Elementary Flying Training School RAF
 No. 3 Maintenance Unit RAF
 No. 4 Glider Training School RAF
 No. 20 (Pilots) Advanced Flying Unit RAF
 No. 2722 Squadron RAF Regiment
 No. 2786 Squadron RAF Regiment
 No. 2796 Squadron RAF Regiment
 No. 2799 Squadron RAF Regiment

References

Citations

Bibliography

Royal Air Force stations in Oxfordshire